KVIL-HD2 (103.7 MHz HD2, The Oasis) is a secondary FM HD Radio station of main sister KVIL dual-licensed to Highland Park and Dallas, Texas. It is owned by Audacy, Inc. and it serves the Dallas/Fort Worth Metroplex in North Texas. The station's studios are located along North Central Expressway in Uptown Dallas, and the transmitter site is in Cedar Hill off West Belt Line Road. The station is branded as "The Oasis" and airs a "modern jazz" format with a heavy focus on smooth jazz.

History
In 2006, KVIL launched its secondary HD Radio channel as "Chick Rock", playing rock music from female artists such as Alanis Morissette, Sheryl Crow, and Joan Jett. Two years later in 2008, the format was changed to Christian rock as "Rise". During its tenure and KVIL's run as an adult contemporary station, KVIL-HD2 would periodically flip to Christmas music from the first of November to the middle of the month when KVIL and KVIL-HD2 would swap their formats for the holiday season until the day after Christmas Day when the stations would swap back. Christmas music would run a few more days on KVIL-HD2 before resuming normal operations as "Rise" on New Year's Eve.

After KVIL retooled its AC format to Hot AC-leaning fare in May 2013, the Christmas music was ultimately passed to sister classic hits station KLUV, while "Rise" continued to broadcast throughout the holiday season. KVIL-HD2 did, however, introduce a one-time seasonal format for the 2014 summer as "NTX Honda Fever" with 'Freddie Fever' as the DJ and the regional North Texas Honda Dealer as its sponsor. It aired a Variety hits playlist that combined Adult Top 40 and Classic Hits music. The format lasted through the end of September before KVIL-HD2 resumed its "Rise" broadcasts.

On October 7, 2015, KVIL-HD2 jettisoned its Christian rock format and flipped to smooth jazz as "The Oasis 103.7 HD2", which was relocated from sister station KMVK's HD2 channel. Sometime in July 2017, "The Oasis" was retooled to have an expanded jazz playlist and live personalities. While the focus is still on smooth jazz, The Oasis has rebranded itself as a "Modern Jazz" station. KVIL-HD2's programming can also be heard on Audacy's platform.

References

External links
The Oasis DFW official website

Radio stations established in 2006
HD Radio stations
VIL